Baileya australis, the small baileya moth, is a moth of the family Nolidae. The species was first described by Augustus Radcliffe Grote in 1881. It is found in North America, where it has been recorded from Quebec and New York to Florida, west to Texas, north to North Dakota and Ontario.

The wingspan is 21–28 mm. The forewings are shiny grey, with silvery or whitish shading in the median area. The subterminal line is heavy and almost straight near the costa and the basal patch is white. The reniform spot is obscure and the postmedial line is sinuate. Adults are on wing from April to September in up to three generations per year in the south.

References

Moths described in 1881
Nolidae
Taxa named by Augustus Radcliffe Grote
Moths of North America